In genetics, floxing refers to the sandwiching of a DNA sequence (which is then said to be floxed) between two lox P sites. The terms are constructed upon the phrase "flanking/flanked by LoxP". Recombination between LoxP sites is catalysed by Cre recombinase. Floxing a gene allows it to be deleted (knocked out), translocated or inverted in a process called Cre-Lox recombination. 
 The floxing of genes is essential in the development of scientific model systems as it allows researchers to have spatial and temporal alteration of gene expression. Moreover, animals such as mice can be used as models to study human disease. Therefore, Cre-lox system can be used in mice to manipulate gene expression in order to study human diseases and drug development. For example, using the Cre-lox system, researchers can study oncogenes and tumor suppressor genes and their role in development and progression of cancer in mice models.

Uses in research 
Floxing a gene allows it to be deleted (knocked out), translocated or inserted (through various mechanisms in Cre-Lox recombination).

The floxing of genes is essential in the development of scientific model systems as it allows spatial and temporal alteration of gene expression. In layman's terms, the gene can be knocked-out (inactivated) in a specific tissue in vivo, at any time chosen by the scientist. The scientist can then evaluate the effects of the knocked-out gene and identify the gene’s normal function. This is different from having the gene absent starting from conception, whereby inactivation or loss of genes that are essential for the development of the organism may interfere with the normal function of cells and prevent the production of viable offspring.

Mechanism of deletion 

Deletion events are useful for performing gene editing experiments through precisely editing out segments of or even whole genes. Deletion requires floxing of the segment of interest with loxP sites which face the same direction. The Cre recombinase will detect the unidirectional loxP sites and excise the floxed segment of DNA. The successfully edited clones can be selected using a selection marker which can be removed using the same Cre-loxP system. The same mechanism can be used to create conditional alleles by introducing an FRT/Flp site which accomplishes the same mechanism but with a different enzyme.

Mechanism of inversion 
Inversion events are useful for maintaining the amount of genetic material. The inverted genes are not often associated with abnormal phenotypes, meaning the inverted genes are generally viable. Cre-loxP recombination that result in insertion requires loxP sites to flox the gene of interest, with the loxP sites oriented towards each other. By undergoing Cre recombination, the region floxed by the loxP sites will become inverted, this process is not permanent and can be reversed.

Mechanism of translocation 
Translocation events occur when the loxP sites flox genes on two different DNA molecules in a unidirectional orientation. Cre recombinase is then used to generate a translocation between the two DNA molecules, exchanging the genetic material from one DNA molecule to the other forming a simultaneous translocation of both floxed genes.

Common applications in research 
Cardiomyocytes (heart muscle tissue) have been shown to express a type of Cre recombinase that is highly specific to cardiomyocytes and can be used by researchers to perform highly efficient recombinations. This is achieved by using a type of Cre whose expression is driven by the -myosin heavy chain promoter (-MyHC). These recombinations are capable of disrupting genes in a manner that is specific to only heart tissue in vivo and allows for the creation of conditional knockouts of the heart mostly for use as controls.

For example, using the Cre recombinase with the -MyHC promoter causes the floxed gene to be inactivated in the heart alone. Further, these knockouts can be inducible. In several mouse studies, tamoxifen is used to induce the Cre recombinase. In this case, Cre recombinase is fused to a portion of the mouse estrogen receptor (ER) which contains a mutation within its ligand binding domain (LBD). The mutation renders the receptor inactive, which leads to incorrect localization through its interactions with chaperone proteins such as heat shock protein 70 and 90 (Hsp70 and Hsp90). Tamoxifen binds to Cre-ER and disrupts its interactions with the chaperones, which allows the Cre-ER fusion protein to enter the nucleus and perform recombination on the floxed gene. Additionally, Cre recombinase can be induced by heat when under the control of specific heat shock elements (HSEs).

References 

DNA
Genetics techniques